Centergazservice-opt LLC (CGSO) is the core of Centergazholding Group, a carbon project developer.

History 
CGSO was formed in 1995 to coordinate conversion of transport from petrol to LPG. In 2004 the company started R&D works on carbon reduction projects.

Operations 
CGSO acts as a project operator and developer of emission reduction projects in gas distribution industry. Fuel-switch projects are operated through a subsidiary United Regional Energy Company LLC (UREC or OREC).

References

External links 
CGSO 
 PDD:Methane Emissions Avoidance in Bryansk Gas Distribution Network
Carbon Reduction Management
Article on opening an office in Altai
Article on Altai-HEPS investment

Companies based in Moscow